Laurens W. Molenkamp (born 4 August 1956) is a professor of physics and Chair of Experimental Physics at the University of Würzburg. He is known for his work on semiconductor structures and topological insulators.

Biography

Laurens W. Molenkamp is an experimental condensed matter physicist. He received his Ph.D. in physical chemistry from the University of Groningen, and spent several years first with Philips Research Laboratories in Eindhoven and then as Associate Professor at the RWTH in Aachen. He came to the University of Würzburg in 1999 and is now the Chair of Experimental Physics III and leads the II-VI MBE (molecular beam epitaxy) unit. His research interests include quantum transport in nanostructures, semiconductor spintronics, and optical spectroscopy of semiconductors. He was a co-recipient of the American Physical Society 2012 Oliver E. Buckley Condensed Matter Prize for his experimental observation of the quantum spin Hall effect, opening up the field of topological insulators. Since 2012, he has been the Editor of the physics journal Physical Review B. He was a 2013 Physics Frontiers Prize laureate (shortlisted for the Fundamental Physics Prize). Thomson Reuters included him on their annual prediction shortlist  for the 2014 Nobel Prize for Physics for his experimental research,  with Charles L. Kane and Shoucheng Zhang, on the quantum spin Hall effect and topological insulators.

Honors
Fellow, American Physical Society
2010 Europhysics Prize
2012 Oliver E. Buckley Condensed Matter Prize
2013 Physics Frontiers Prize laureate (shortlisted for the Fundamental Physics Prize)
2013 Foreign membership of the Royal Netherlands Academy of Arts and Sciences
2014 Gottfried Wilhelm Leibniz Prize
2017 Stern-Gerlach Medal
2017 King Faisal International Prize
2018 Bavarian Maximilian Order for Science and Art

References

External links
Experimental Physics 3 Department, University of Würzburg
Home Page of Physical Review B

1956 births
Living people
Dutch physical chemists
People from Loppersum
University of Groningen alumni
Fellows of the American Physical Society
Members of the Royal Netherlands Academy of Arts and Sciences
Academic staff of the University of Würzburg
Experimental physicists
Oliver E. Buckley Condensed Matter Prize winners